The Citadel of Silence (French: La citadelle du silence) is a 1937 French drama film directed by Marcel L'Herbier and starring Annabella, Pierre Renoir and Bernard Lancret. The film's sets were designed by the art directors Andrej Andrejew and Guy de Gastyne.

Cast
 Annabella as Viana  
 Pierre Renoir as Stepan  
 Bernard Lancret as César Birsky  
 Gilberte Géniat as Catherine  
 Pauline Carton as La logeuse  
 Pierre Larquey as Bartek  
 Paul Amiot as Vladorowsky  
 Robert Le Vigan as Granoff  
 Roger Blin as Officier  
 Pierre Alcover as Le gouverneur de Varsovie  
 Jeanne Fusier-Gir as La fille du majordome  
 Alexandre Rignault as Le gardien  
 Mady Berry as Patronne de l'hôtel  
 Georges Melchior as Nevitzky  
 Lucas Gridoux as L'espion  
 José Squinquel as Le capitaine  
 Claire Gérard as La nounou  
 Marguerite Pierry as La logeuse  
 Marthe Mellot as Joséphine 
 Denise Jovelet as Vania enfant  
 Georges Saillard as Un insurgé  
 Fabien Loris as Le 836  
 Marcel Rouzé as Un officier à la citadelle  
 Henri Échourin as Le porteur 
 Fernand Bellan 
 Henry Darbray 
 Guy Decomble 
 Georges Lannes as Kerlov 
 André Nox 
 Philippe Richard

References

Bibliography 
 Jonathan Driskell. The French Screen Goddess: Film Stardom and the Modern Woman in 1930s France. I.B.Tauris, 2015.

External links 
 

1937 films
French drama films
1937 drama films
1930s French-language films
Films directed by Marcel L'Herbier
Films scored by Darius Milhaud
Films with screenplays by Jean Anouilh
French black-and-white films
1930s French films